The Captain's Ship (Spanish: La nao capitana) is a 1947 Spanish historical drama film directed by Florián Rey and starring Paola Barbara, Manuel Luna and José Nieto. The film's sets were designed by the art director Sigfrido Burmann.

Main cast
 Paola Barbara as Doña Estrella 
 Manuel Luna as El Fugitivo  
 José Nieto as Capitán Diego Ruiz 
 Raquel Rodrigo as Doña Leonor  
 Jorge Mistral as Martín Villalba  
 Rafael Calvo as Fray Gutiérrez  
 Dolores Valcárcel as Doña Trinidad 
 Fernando Fernández de Córdoba as Fray José  
 Jesús Tordesillas as Don Antonio  
 José María Lado as Maestre Barrios  
 Manuel Dicenta 
 Nicolás D. Perchicot
 José Jaspe 
 Manuel Requena as Profesor de esgrima  
 Nati Mistral  as Cantante en el paso del Ecuador

References

Bibliography 
 D'Lugo, Marvin. Guide to the Cinema of Spain. Greenwood Publishing Group, 1997.

External links 
 

1947 films
1940s Spanish-language films
Films directed by Florián Rey
Seafaring films
Suevia Films films
Spanish historical drama films
1940s historical drama films
Spanish black-and-white films
1947 drama films
1940s Spanish films